Luigi Barral (23 March 1907 in Perosa Argentina – 7 November 1962 in Lyon) was an Italian cyclist. He became a French citizen in 1949.

Major results

1931
 1st Giro di Campania
1932
 1st Mount Faron Hill Climb
 1st Grand Prix de Nice
 2nd Grand Prix de Cannes
 8th Overall Giro d'Italia
 9th Overall Tour de France
1933
 1st Nice–Mont Agel
 2nd Giro di Lombardia
 3rd Circuit de la Haute-Savoie
1934
 1st Nice–Mont Agel
 1st Mount Faron Hill Climb
 3rd Tre Valli Varesine
 10th Overall Giro d'Italia
1935
 1st Grand Prix de Nice
 1st Nice–Mont Agel
 3rd Marseille–Nice
 3rd Circuit des villes d'eaux d'Auvergne
1936
 1st Marseille–Nice
 1st Nice–Mont Agel
 1st Puy de Dome
 3rd Tour du Vaucluse
 3rd Giro di Lombardia
1937
 1st Circuit des Cols Pyrénéens
 1st Mount Faron Hill Climb
 1st Nice–Mont Agel
 2nd Polymultipliée
 3rd Grand Prix de Cannes
1938
 2nd Nice–Mont Agel
1939
 1st Mount Faron Hill Climb

References

1907 births
1962 deaths
Italian male cyclists
French male cyclists
Sportspeople from the Metropolitan City of Turin
Cyclists from Piedmont